The 2009 Magny-Cours Superleague Formula round was the opening round of the 2009 Superleague Formula season, with the races taking place on 28 June 2009. Liverpool F.C. and A.C. Milan shared the two race wins, with Liverpool also being the Weekend Winner after winning the six-car Super Final. The supporting events were the Euroseries 3000 and the Mitjet Series.

Report

Qualifying
As always, the field was split into two groups for qualifying, with the fastest four qualifiers from each progressing into the knockout stages to decide places 1 to 8 on the grid. Davide Rigon and Max Wissel driving the cars of Olympiacos and FC Basel 1893 both recorded times faster than Group A fourth place, Enrique Bernoldi (CR Flamengo). In the knockout stages, an all-British battle was the highlight of round one, with Rangers' John Martin and Tottenham's Craig Dolby recording the two fastest times of the first round. However, it was Melton Mowbray's Dolby who was faster, by three tenths of a second. Dolby's run ended at the semi-final stage, after spinning during his lap.

Antônio Pizzonia of SC Corinthians put paid to his hope, and would face Adrián Vallés in the Liverpool machine in the final. Pizzonia would come out on top by 0.299 seconds, to take his team's first pole position in Superleague Formula. Post-qualifying, the car of debutants FC Midtjylland, driven by Kasper Andersen was sent to the back of the grid, for failing to complete a round one lap due to a blistered tyre.

Race 1
Pizzonia led away from the start, leading Vallés and Dolby before the safety car came out. Last year's champion driver Rigon attempted an over-optimistic passing move on F.C. Porto's Tristan Gommendy. The Italian ran into the back of the R.S.C. Anderlecht car of Yelmer Buurman, the drivers runner-up of last season, and spun at the Adelaide Hairpin. Gommendy and Martin also spun, while other cars had to drive through the gravel trap on the outside of the corner to avoid the hubbub on track. Once the race got under away again, Pizzonia started to pull away from his two chasers, although Vallés started to re-catch the ex-Formula One driver, and by lap five had passed him in a similar move to his pass on Dolby on lap one.

Dolby then closed to the back of Pizzonia, before the Brazilian pitted at the end of lap nine. A sloppy stop cost him dearly, as Dolby, Buurman and reigning GP2 Series champion Giorgio Pantano, who was making his debut in the series, in the car of A.C. Milan. Vallés made his pit stop on lap five, and came out eight seconds to the good from Buurman, which he then extended to twelve seconds at one point. He did however back off towards the conclusion of the 45-minute race, and won by 6.5 seconds to give Liverpool their third win in Superleague Formula, tying the mark of Beijing Guoan for most wins. Buurman finished second, for Anderlecht's fourth second-place finish without success and Dolby finished third. Pantano had been all set to finish fourth, however a late spin saw him fall to twelfth. Pizzonia finished fourth ahead of Duncan Tappy (Galatasaray S.K.), Bernoldi, debutant Pedro Petiz (Sporting CP), Andersen, Miguel Molina (Al Ain) and Wissel rounded out the top ten. Gommendy, Martin and Rigon all retired, along with another debutant Jonathan Kennard in the car of A.S. Roma.

Race 2
In the reverse grid race, Rigon started from pole position after his first lap antics in race one. However, he was jumped at the start by the fast-starting Martin, with Kennard in third ahead of Pantano. The Italian would take Kennard on lap three, to move into third place. Further back, Dolby (who started 16th after his race one podium) was charging his way through the field, having passed six cars to make the top ten, in as many laps. Pantano closed in on both Martin and Rigon, with Rigon blinking first for the mandatory pit stop. Pantano followed Martin, who pitted on lap nine, but that turned into a calamity for the Australian.

Pantano gained the advantage after the pit stops, with an advantage of some five seconds over his fellow Italian Rigon. However, the current GP2 racer closed in on Pantano, getting the gap down to as low as 1.9 seconds, before making a crucial error at the Adelaide Hairpin. Pantano thus won the race in only his second race, by 2.2 seconds from Rigon. After Martin's crashing out, Wissel came to clinch third and a spot in the Super Final. Molina was fourth, ahead of Buurman (up from 17th), Vallés (up from 18th), Gommendy, Bernoldi, Pizzonia and Dolby (who lost drive on the final lap). Joining Martin on the retirements list were Kennard, Andersen, Petiz and Dominick Muermans (PSV Eindhoven).

Super Final
New for 2009, the "Super Final" race decides who will pick up a bonus of €100,000 and the title of "Weekend Winner". The top three cars from each race qualify for the event. Originally, the qualifiers were Liverpool, Anderlecht, Spurs, Milan, Olympiacos and Basel, but Spurs failed to take the start due to their sixth gear problem at the end of the second race. Therefore, Corinthians took their place on the six-car grid, for the eight-lap race.

Vallés took the lead from pole position, leading from Pantano, Buurman, Rigon, Pizzonia and Wissel. Pizzonia made the first attack, with a move on Rigon at Adelaide on lap one. He succeeded with the move, and set off after Buurman, passing him at the start of lap two. The Dutchman slipstreamed back to the Brazilian and tried to make a move on the Corinthians car, but failed to make it. Rigon had trouble at the start of lap three, dropping to last behind Wissel. Vallés continued his speed at the front, and unsurprisingly won the race, beating Pantano by close to five seconds. Pizzonia finished third, ahead of Buurman, Wissel and Rigon.

Results

Qualifying
 In each group, the top four qualify for the quarter-finals.

Group A

Group B

Knockout stages

Grid

 * Andersen sent to the back row of the grid, following his failure to complete a lap in the first round. He started 17th as he recorded a faster lap time than Kennard.

Race 1

Race 2

Super Final

 * Corinthians lined up in the super final, as Tottenham could not start due to their problems in race two.

Standings after the round

References

External links
 Official results from the Superleague Formula website

Magny-Cours
Superleague Formula
Magny-Cours Superleague Formula round